Drakhjärta is a 2016 Swedish family drama film.

Storyline 
Nisse Berg is eleven years old and when we meet him the first time he lives a "life of"bad luck". His mother Sara is no longer alive. Before she died she gave Nisse a lizard, which Nisse finds boring and ugly so he names him Harry, because he looks like an old, grumpy man. But one day, Harry starts talking. He claims to be a dragon, with a dragonheart, and wonders if Nisse wants one too. Drakhjärta is about trying to accept life as it is. About being you, growing up, and changing while the rest of the world keeps going, despite the horrible thing that has happened.

Characters 

 Julius Grawin as Tage
 Bill Hugg as Grandfather
 Chatarina Larsson as Grandmother
 Magnus Schmitz as Dad
 Malte Legros Selander as Nisse

Reception 
The film has received eight out of ten stars from IMDb on six reviews.

See also 

 Lists of Swedish films
 List of Swedish films of the 2010s

References

External links 

 

2016 films
2010s Swedish-language films
Swedish drama films
2010s Swedish films